Akpan Okon  was the last Obong (king) of Ibom Kingdom around 1690-1720. He was overthrown by his brother Akakpokpo Okon with the support of groups such as the Eze Agwu, Nnachi Ipia, and the Nnubi dynasty in the final phases of the Aro-Ibibio Wars. Akpan Okon's defeat was very significant and crucial to the alliance. The alliance between the Eze Agwu lineage and his ambitious brother Akakpokpo sealed his fate, defeated Obong Okon Ita, and laid the foundation of the Arochukwu kingdom.

External links 
http://www.aro-okigbo.com/history_of_the_aros.htm
https://web.archive.org/web/20081121232256/http://www.aronetwork.org/others/arohistory.html
http://www.aronewsonline.com/origincivilization.html

Aro people
18th-century rulers in Africa
18th-century Nigerian people
Ibibio
Calabar